Ugadi or Yugadi, also known as Samvatsarādi, is New Year's Day according to the Hindu calendar and is celebrated in the states of Andhra Pradesh, Telangana, Karnataka, Tamil Nadu and Goa in India. It is festively observed in these regions on the first day of the Hindu lunisolar calendar month of Chaitra. This typically falls in April month of the Gregorian calendar. It also falls during the Tamil month of either Panguni or Chithrai, sometimes on the day after Amavasya with 27th Nakshatra Revati. Ugadi day is pivoted on the first New Moon after March Equinox.

The day is observed by drawing colourful patterns on the floor called Muggulu, mango leaf decorations on doors called torana, buying and giving gifts such as new clothes, giving charity to the poor, oil massages followed by special baths, preparing and sharing a special food called pachadi, and visiting Hindu temples. The pachadi is a notable festive food that combines all flavors – sweet, sour, salty, bitter, astringent and piquant. In Telugu and Kannada Hindu traditions, it is a symbolic reminder that one must expect all flavors of experiences in the coming new year and make the most of them. Followers of the Souramana calendar system observe Ugadi in Karnataka, when the sun transits into the Aries Constellation, which is also the festival of Baisakhi, and is locally known as Souramana Ugadi or Mesha Sankranti. 

Ugadi has been an important and historic festival of the Hindus, with medieval texts and inscriptions recording major charitable donations to Hindu temples and community centers on this day. The same day is observed as a New Year by Hindus in many other parts of India, such as Gudi Padwa in Maharashtra and is a national public holiday in Mauritius.

Terminology 
The name Yugadi or Ugadi is derived from the Sanskrit words yuga (age) and ādi (beginning): "the beginning of a new age". Yugadi or Ugadi falls on "Chaitra Shudhdha Paadyami" or the first day of the bright half of the Indian month of Chaitra. This generally falls in late March or early April of the Gregorian calendar.

The Telugu people use the term Ugadi (ఉగాది) and the Kannadigas use the term Yugadi (ಯುಗಾದಿ) for this festival.

Practices 

The Telugu, Kannada, Kodava and the Tulu diaspora in Andhra Pradesh, Telangana, Karnataka and Tamil Nadu celebrate the festival with great fanfare; gatherings of the extended family and a sumptuous feast are 'de rigueur'. The day begins early with ritual showers, rubbing the body with perfumed oil, followed by prayers.

Preparations for the festival begin a week ahead. Houses are given a thorough clean. People buy new clothes, including dhoti, and buy new items for the festival, decorate the entrance of their houses with fresh mango leaves. Mango leaves and coconuts are considered auspicious in the Hindu tradition, and they are used on Ugadi. People also clean the front of their house with water and cow dung paste, then draw colorful floral designs. People offer prayers in temples. The celebration of Ugadi is marked by religious zeal and social merriment. According to Vasudha Narayanan, a professor of Religion at the University of Florida:
The pacchadi festive dish symbolically reminds the people that the following year – as all of life – will consist of not just sweet experiences, but a combination of sweet, sour, salty, and bitter episodes. Just as the different substances are bound together, one is reminded that no event or episode is wholly good or bad. Even in the midst of bitter experiences, there are sweet moments. One is also reminded that the experience of taste is transitory and ephemeral; so too, is life, and one has to learn to put pain and pleasure in proper temporal perspective.

Special dishes are prepared for the occasion. In Karnataka, foods such as Holige or Obattu, and mango pickles are made. In addition, a speciality of yugadi in Karnataka is to create "bEvu-bella" a mixture of neem and jaggery. This symbolizes life's own experiences with a little bit of bitternes and a hint of sweetness. In Andhra Pradesh, foods such as pulihora, bobbatlu (Bhakshalu/ polelu/ oligale), New Year Burelu and Pachadi, and preparations made with raw mango go well with the occasion. Of these, pachadi (or Ugadi pacchadi) is the most notable, and consists of a chutney-like dish which combines ingredients to give all six flavours of food (షడ్రుచులు - ṣaḍruculu) : sweet (తీపి - tīpi), sour (పులుపు - pulupu), salty (ఉప్పు - uppu), spicy (కారం - kāraṁ), bitter (చేదు - cēdu) and astringent (వగరు - vagaru). This festive Hindu food is made from tamarind paste (sour), neem flowers (bitter), brown sugar or sweet jaggery (sweet), table salt (salt), green chilli (spicy) and raw mango (astringent). It is a symbolic reminder of complex phases of life one should reasonably expect in the new year.

Related festivals
Maharashtran Hindus refer to the festival, observed on the same day, as Gudi Padwa. The Sindhis celebrate the same day as Cheti Chand, which is the beginning of their calendar year. Manipuris also celebrate their New Year as Sajibu Nongma Panba on the same day.

The Hindus of Bali in Indonesia also celebrate their new year on the same day as Nyepi. Ugadi is one of the five Hindu national public holidays in Mauritius.

See also 
 Astronomical basis of the Hindu calendar
 Hindu units of time
 Yuga
 Vishu

References 

Hindu festivals
Religious festivals in India
Culture of Andhra Pradesh
Festivals in Maharashtra
Festivals in Andhra Pradesh
Festivals in Karnataka
Festivals in Telangana
March observances
April observances
Culture of Karnataka
New Year in India
Observances in India
Hindu festivals in India